Lacera noctilio is a moth of the family Erebidae. It is found in Africa, where it is known from Malawi and La Réunion and southern Asia, Australia and several Pacific islands (Samoa, New Caledonia, Tonga, the Marianas and Carolines).

Larvae have mostly been recorded from Leguminosae (Caesalpinia), but also on Pisonia (Nyctaginaceae), Canthium (Rubiaceae) and Verbenaceae.

References

Moths described in 1794
Moths of Asia
Moths of Japan
Moths of Réunion
Moths of Africa
Lacera
Lepidoptera of Malawi